Cindy Patton (born February 12, 1956) is an American sociologist and historian specializing in the history of the AIDS epidemic. A former faculty member at Temple University and Emory University, she currently teaches at Simon Fraser University, where she held the Canada Research Chair in Community, Culture, and Health from 2003 to 2014. Her work has appeared in Criticism, the Feminist Review, and the International Review of Qualitative Research, and she co-edited a special edition of Cultural Studies on French sociologist Pierre Bourdieu.

Patton is a graduate of Appalachian State University, Harvard University, and the University of Massachusetts. She received the Stonewall Book Award in 1986 for her book Sex and Germs: The Politics of AIDS, and was nominated for a Lambda Literary Award in 1991 for Inventing AIDS.

Bibliography
Sex and Germs: The Politics of AIDS (1985)
Making It: A Woman's Guide to Sex in the Age of AIDS (1987) (with Janis Kelly)
Inventing AIDS (1990)
Women and AIDS (1993)
Last Served?: Gendering the HIV Pandemic (1994)
Fatal Advice: How Safe-Sex Education Went Wrong (1996)
Cinematic Identity: Anatomy of a Problem Film (1997)
Queer Diasporas (2000) (as editor with Benigno Sánchez-Eppler)
Globalizing AIDS (2002)
Cinematic Identity: Anatomy of a Problem Film (2007)
Global Science/Women's Health (2008) (as editor with Helen Loshny)
Rebirth of the Clinic: Places and Agents in Contemporary Health Care (2010) (as editor)
L.A. Plays Itself / Boys In The Sand : A Queer Film Classic (Queer Film Classics) (2014)

See also
 Joshua Gamson

References

21st-century American historians
American sociologists
American women sociologists
American lesbian writers
1956 births
Living people
LGBT historians
Harvard Divinity School alumni
20th-century American non-fiction writers
21st-century American non-fiction writers
Temple University faculty
Academic staff of Simon Fraser University
Appalachian State University alumni
University of Massachusetts Amherst alumni
20th-century Canadian women writers
20th-century Canadian writers
21st-century Canadian women writers
American women historians
Stonewall Book Award winners
20th-century American women writers
21st-century American women writers
21st-century American LGBT people